Scott Davidson was a session musician, playing the keyboard, with Bros and Pet Shop Boys, before founding the Trade-It free advert paper and becoming a director and then chairman of Bristol City FC from 1996-2001. In 2003 Davidson was a co-founder of The Big Fundraiser, now known as The Invitation Book, a discount voucher annual which aims to raise money for charities, based on an American publication, Entertainment. He also has interests in software development, property, manufacturing and publishing in Ireland. His current project is vouchercloud.com the digital voucher and discount platform which is responsible for the iPhone and Android app vouchercloud.

References

Bristol City F.C.
Pet Shop Boys
1963 births
Musicians from Bristol
Living people